Angus Valdemar Hambro (8 July 1883 – 19 November 1957)  was a British  Conservative Party politician.

Early life
Angus Valdemar Hambro was born on 8 July 1883.

His father, Sir Everard Hambro, was a banker. His paternal grandfather, Carl Joachim Hambro, was a Danish immigrant who founded the Hambros Bank in London in 1839. His paternal great-grandfather, Joseph Hambro, was a Danish merchant, banker and political advisor. His paternal great-great-grandfather, Calmer Hambro, was a Danish merchant and banker.

He was educated at Eton. He served in the Queen's Own Dorset Yeomanry.

Career
He was Member of Parliament for South Dorset from 1910 to 1922; High Sheriff of Dorset from 1934  to 1935 and a Member of Parliament again from 1937 to 1945, this time for North Dorset.

Golf
He was a noted amateur golfer.

Results timeline

Note: Hambro only played in the Open Championship and the Amateur Championship.

NT = No tournament
WD = Withdrew
CUT = Missed the half-way cut
"T" indicates a tie for a place
R256, R128, R64, R32, R16, QF, SF = Round in which player lost in match play

Sources: www.opengolf.com, The Glasgow Herald, 20 May 1903, pg. 13., The Glasgow Herald, 24 May 1905, pg. 12., The Glasgow Herald, 28 May 1907, pg. 12., The Glasgow Herald, 28 May 1908, pg. 13., The Glasgow Herald, 25 May 1909, pg. 13., The Glasgow Herald, 1 June 1910, pg. 10., The Glasgow Herald, 31 May 1911, pg. 9.,The American Golfer, July, 1912, pg. 200., The Glasgow Herald, 27 May 1913, pg. 14., The Glasgow Herald, 21 May 1914, pg. 15., The Glasgow Herald, 10 June 1920, pg. 9., The Glasgow Herald, 25 May 1921, pg. 6., The Glasgow Herald, 23 May 1922, pg. 9., The Glasgow Herald, 9 May 1923, pg. 13., The Glasgow Herald, 29 May 1924, pg. 13., The Glasgow Herald, 28 May 1925, pg. 9., The Glasgow Herald, 23 May 1928, pg. 10., The Glasgow Herald, 12 Jun 1929, pg. 14.

Team appearances
England–Scotland Amateur Match (representing England): 1908, 1909, 1910 (winners), 1922
Coronation Match (representing the Amateurs): 1911

Notes

External links

1883 births
1957 deaths
People educated at Eton College
Conservative Party (UK) MPs for English constituencies
UK MPs 1910–1918
UK MPs 1918–1922
UK MPs 1935–1945
British people of Danish descent
British people of German-Jewish descent
Barons of Denmark
Angus
Queen's Own Dorset Yeomanry officers
Amateur golfers
English male golfers
British sportsperson-politicians